Pre-Meditated Drama is the debut album by American rap duo Steady Mobb'n, released May 6, 1997 on Bomb Shelter and No Limit Records. The 12 songs DJ Daryl produced were recorded at The Grill Studios in Oakland California. It managed to gain decent success, peaking at number 6 on the Billboard Top R&B/Hip-Hop Albums and at 29 on the Billboard 200 selling 74,000 copies in its first week.  

The original version of "If I Could Change" was heard in the film, I'm Bout It, and was also released as a single and a music video to promote the film's soundtrack. The soundtrack came out shortly after this album and the song was produced by DJ Daryl.

Critical reception

The Source (5/97, p. 128) - 3.5 Mics (out of 5) - "...Pre-Meditated Drama shows that (Steady Mobb'n) definitely have those engaging narratives of the hustling street life....if you truly appreciate gangsta rap and the sound that has made No Limit records so popular, then this is the album for you..."

Track listing
"Intro"
"Strong Heart"
"It's On" (featuring Master P, Fiend & Mystikal)
"Animosity"
"Trouble" (featuring Richie Rich)
"Kidnap Call" (skit)
"West to South" (featuring Master P, Fiend, C-Murder, Silkk the Shocker, Mac, C-Loc, Kane & Abel)
"Puff Puff Pass"
"Dice Game" (skit)
"Check ya Nuts"
"Trying to Get Mine" (featuring Master P & JT the Bigga Figga)
"Call Back" (skit)
"Blood Money" (featuring Marvin Klark)
"Lil Nigga"
"Up to no Good" (featuring Master P, Mia X & Big Ed)
"Block Monsters" (featuring Killa K, Marvin Klark & Kollision)
"Mr. Serv On commercial"
"4 Corners" (featuring Dirty White)
"If I Could Change" (remix) (featuring Ephrine Galloway & Juda)

Chart history

References

External links
 Pre-Meditated Drama at Discogs

Steady Mobb'n albums
1997 debut albums
No Limit Records albums
Priority Records albums